Salesian Catholic High School was an all boys Catholic high school opened on Harper Avenue in Detroit, Michigan, United States, in 1950. The school closed in 1970.

References

High schools in Detroit
Defunct Catholic secondary schools in Michigan